The 1975 Minnesota Golden Gophers football team represented the University of Minnesota in the 1975 Big Ten Conference football season. In their fourth year under head coach Cal Stoll, the Golden Gophers compiled a 6–5 record and were outscored by their opponents by a combined total of 236 to 192. 
 
Quarterback Tony Dungy received the team's Most Valuable Player award. Dungy and safety Doug Beaudoin were named All-Big Ten second team.  Dungy was also named Academic All-Big Ten.

Total attendance for the season was 220,081, which averaged to 31,440. The season high for attendance was against Michigan State.

Schedule

Roster
Tommie Ash #8
QB Tony Dungy

Game summaries

Iowa

References

Minnesota
Minnesota Golden Gophers football seasons
Minnesota Golden Gophers football